Nemapogon flavifrons is a moth of the family Tineidae. It is found in Afghanistan.

References

Moths described in 1959
Nemapogoninae